Jeremy Ruckert (born August 11, 2000) is an American football tight end for the New York Jets of the National Football League (NFL). He played college football at Ohio State and was drafted 101st overall in the third round of the 2022 NFL Draft.

High school career
Ruckert attended Lindenhurst Senior High School in Lindenhurst, New York. During his career he had 222 receptions for 3,133 yards and 37 touchdowns. As a senior, Ruckert was the New York Gatorade Football Player of the Year after catching 61 passes for 1,094 yards with 13 touchdowns and 61 tackles, 13 sacks and two interceptions. He played in the 2018 U. S. Army All-American Bowl. He committed to Ohio State University to play college football.

College career
As a true freshman at Ohio State in 2018, Ruckert had one reception for 13 yards. He played in all 14 games his sophomore year in 2019, recording 14 receptions for 142 yards and four touchdowns. As a junior in 2020, he had 13 receptions for 151 receiving yards and five receiving touchdowns. As a senior in 2021, he had 26 receptions for 309 receiving yards and three receiving touchdowns.

Professional career

Ruckert was drafted by the New York Jets in the third round, 101st overall, of the 2022 NFL Draft. As a rookie, he appeared in nine games. He had one reception for eight yards and contributed on special teams as well.

References

External links
 New York Jets bio
Ohio State Buckeyes bio

Living people
People from Lindenhurst, New York
Players of American football from New York (state)
Sportspeople from Suffolk County, New York
American football tight ends
Ohio State Buckeyes football players
2000 births
New York Jets players